Acrocercops mechanopla is a moth of the family Gracillariidae, known from Maharashtra, India. It was described by Edward Meyrick in 1934. The hostplant for the species is Gmelina arborea.

References

mechanopla
Moths of Asia
Moths described in 1934